William August Schwartz (April 3, 1864 – December 22, 1940) was a 19th-century baseball catcher who played for two seasons. He was born in Jamestown, Kentucky, and was Jewish. He played for the Columbus Buckeyes of the American Association in 1883 and the Cincinnati Outlaw Reds of the Union Association in 1884, playing in 31 career games.

References

External links

1864 births
1940 deaths
Major League Baseball catchers
Columbus Buckeyes players
Cincinnati Outlaw Reds players
Peoria Reds players
Columbus Buckeyes (minor league) players
Baseball players from Kentucky
19th-century baseball players
People from Jamestown, Kentucky
Jewish American baseball players
Jewish Major League Baseball players